Jacob "Sjaak" Troost (born 28 August 1959) is a Dutch retired footballer who played as a defender.

Club career
Born in Pernis, South Holland, Troost played his entire career with local Feyenoord, making his Eredivisie debut on 9 April 1978 in a 0–1 away loss against FC Volendam and becoming an undisputed starter from the 1981–82 season onwards. He appeared in 29 games in 1983–84 as the Rotterdam club won the league after a 10-year wait, scoring once in a 4–0 win at Fortuna Sittard as the campaign also ended with Dutch Cup conquest.

Troost appeared in 397 official matches for Feyenoord, retiring in June 1992 at nearly 33. Later on, he became the club's commercial director.

International career
Troost earned four caps for the Dutch national team. His debut came on 9 September 1987 in a 0–0 friendly with Belgium, in front of a familiar crowd at De Kuip (90 minutes played).

Troost was selected for the squad that appeared at UEFA Euro 1988 in West Germany, being an unused squad member for the eventual champions.

Honours

Club
Feyenoord
Eredivisie: 1983–84
KNVB Cup: 1979–80, 1983–84, 1990–91, 1991–92
Johan Cruijff Shield: 1991

International
Netherlands
UEFA European Championship: 1988

See also
List of one-club men

References

External links
Stats at Voetbal International 

1959 births
Living people
Footballers from Rotterdam
Dutch footballers
Association football defenders
Eredivisie players
Feyenoord players
Netherlands international footballers
UEFA Euro 1988 players
UEFA European Championship-winning players